Gjerstad Church is a parish church of the Church of Norway in Osterøy Municipality in Vestland county, Norway. It is located in the village of Gjerstad. It is the church for the Gjerstad parish which is part of the Åsane prosti (deanery) in the Diocese of Bjørgvin. The white, wooden church was built in a long church design in 1870 using plans drawn up by the architect Ole Vangberg. The church seats about 420 people.

History
The earliest existing historical records of the church date back to the year 1329, but it was not new that year. The first church in Gjerstad was a wooden stave church that was likely built around the year 1210. There are some items from this church that are preserved at the Bergen Museum such as a soapstone baptismal font that help to date the church. That church was in poor condition by the early 1600s, so in 1622, the church was taken down and a new timber-framed long church was built on roughly the same site (above the old choir and to the east). There was also a  church porch with a tower on top. In 1724, the church was sold from the state to a private owner. In 1868, the church was purchased by the municipality and the church was deemed to be in need of replacement. Ole Vangberg was hired to design and build the new church on the same site. He based his designs on the nearby Bruvik Church. Shortly thereafter, in 1870, the church was torn down and a new church was built on the same site. In 1930, there was a fire in the church, but it was repaired soon after. The church was partly rebuilt in 1956-1957 by architect O. Landmark. During the rebuilding, sacristies were built on the north and south sides of the choir and a small church porch was built on the west end of the nave.

See also
List of churches in Bjørgvin

References

Osterøy
Churches in Vestland
Long churches in Norway
Wooden churches in Norway
19th-century Church of Norway church buildings
Churches completed in 1870
13th-century establishments in Norway